Garanča (masculine: Garančs) is a Latvian topographic surname. Notable people with the surname include:

Anita Garanča (1949–2015), Latvian singer, mother of Elīna
Elīna Garanča (born 1976), Latvian opera singer

Toponymic surnames
Latvian-language feminine surnames